Edwin Dibrell Williams (January 19, 1910 – April 2, 1992) was an American professional baseball infielder who played in Major League Baseball (MLB) from 1930 to 1935 with the Philadelphia Athletics and Boston Red Sox.

Biography
Williams was born in 1910 in Greenbrier, Arkansas, and attended Hendrix College and Oklahoma A&M (now Oklahoma State University). At Hendrix, he played college basketball, college football, and competed in track and field. At Oklahoma A&M, he played on the non-varsity baseball team in 1928, was a quarterback on the football team—earning a varsity letter in 1926, 1927, and 1928—and was a member of Lambda Chi Alpha.

Williams' professional baseball career spanned 1929 to 1947; he missed the 1943–1945 seasons while serving in the United States Army. Primarily a second baseman, he played every infield position, and one game as a left fielder, during his time playing professionally.

Williams played in Major League Baseball with the Philadelphia Athletics from 1930 to 1935, including all seven games of the Athletics' loss to the St. Louis Cardinals in the 1931 World Series. Williams' contract was sold to the Boston Red Sox on May 1, 1935, and he finished the year with Boston, his final major league season. In six major league seasons, Williams compiled a .267 batting average with 29 home runs and 201 runs batted in in 475 games played. Defensively, he had a .955 fielding percentage in 215 games at second base, and fielded .930 in 195 games at shortstop.

In addition to playing professionally as late as 1947, Williams managed minor league teams in 1941 and 1946–1948.

Williams died in 1992 at age 82 in Searcy, Arkansas, and was buried in his hometown of Greenbrier.

References

Further reading

External links

1910 births
1992 deaths
People from Greenbrier, Arkansas
Hendrix College alumni
Oklahoma State Cowboys football players
Major League Baseball infielders
Philadelphia Athletics players
Boston Red Sox players
Baseball players from Arkansas
Minor league baseball managers
Little Rock Travelers players
Syracuse Chiefs players
Sacramento Solons players
Decatur Commodores players
Columbus Red Birds players
New Orleans Pelicans (baseball) players
Augusta Tigers players
Borger Gassers players
United States Army personnel of World War II